Pamela Faber Benítez (born 1950) is an American/Spanish linguist. She has held the Chair of Translation and Interpreting at the Department of Translation and Interpreting of the University of Granada since 2001.

She received her Ph.D. from the University of Granada in 1986 and also holds degrees from the University of North Carolina at Chapel Hill and Paris-Sorbonne University.

Research

Pamela Faber is best known for her works on the Functional Lexematic Model and her cognitive theory of Terminology called Frame-Based Terminology.

Functional Lexematic Model
The Functional Lexematic Model was elaborated by Leocadio Martín Mingorance  and further developed by his collaborators Pamela Faber and Ricardo Mairal. It integrates Coşeriu's Theory of Lexematics and Dik's Functional Grammar.

The two main objectives sought within this lexicological model are:
 the specification of the semantic architecture of the lexicon of a language, and
 the representation of knowledge based on the linguistic encoding found in dictionary entries.

These objectives are mutually dependent in the sense that the former serves as the input for the latter.

Frame-Based Terminology

Frame-Based Terminology is a recent cognitive approach to Terminology developed by Pamela Faber and colleagues at the University of Granada. It was conceived within the context of the Functional Lexematic Model and Cognitive Linguistics.

Frame-Based Terminology focuses on:
 conceptual organization;
 the multidimensional nature of terminological units; and
 the extraction of semantic and syntactic information through the use of multilingual corpora.

Within this context, Faber's current major project is called EcoLexicon, a terminological knowledge base on the Environment.

Seminal publications

 Faber, Pamela (ed.). 2012. A Cognitive Linguistics View of Terminology and Specialized Language. Berlin, Boston: Mouton De Gruyter..
 Faber, Pamela, Pilar León Araúz, and Juan Antonio Prieto Velasco. 2009. Semantic Relations, Dynamicity, and Terminological Knowledge Bases. Current Issues in Language Studies 1: 1-23.

 Faber, Pamela, Silvia Montero Martínez, María Rosa Castro Prieto, José Senso Ruiz, Juan Antonio Prieto Velasco, Pilar León Araúz, Carlos Márquez Linares, and Miguel Vega Expósito. 2006. Process-oriented terminology management in the domain of Coastal Engineering. Terminology 12, no. 2: 189-213. .
 Faber, Pamela, Carlos Márquez Linares, and Miguel Vega Expósito. 2005. Framing Terminology: A Process-Oriented Approach. Meta : journal des traducteurs / Meta: Translators’ Journal 50, no. 4.
 Faber, Pamela, and Catalina Jiménez Hurtado. 2004. Traducción, lenguaje y cognición. Granada: Comares.
 Faber, Pamela, and Catalina Jiménez Hurtado. 2002. Investigar en terminología. Granada: Comares.
 Faber, Pamela, and Ricardo Mairal Usón. 1999. Constructing a Lexicon of English Verbs. Berlin: Mouton de Gruyter..

References

External links
 Pamela Faber's profile at LexiCon Research Group

Linguists from the United States
Linguists from Spain
1950 births
Living people
University of North Carolina at Chapel Hill alumni
University of Paris alumni
Women linguists
American expatriates in France
American emigrants to Spain